Tolna was an administrative county of the Kingdom of Hungary. Its territory, which was about the same as that of present Tolna county, is now in central Hungary. The capital of the county was Tolnavár and later Szekszárd.

Geography
Tolna county shared borders with the Hungarian counties Somogy, Veszprém, Fejér, Pest-Pilis-Solt-Kiskun and Baranya. The river Danube formed most of its eastern border. Its area was 3537 km² around 1910.

History

Tolna county arose as one of the first comitatuses of the Kingdom of Hungary, in the 11th century.
Part of Hungary was in the 1500s taken and controlled by the Ottoman Empire during the ruling of Suleiman the Magnificent.

Demographics

1900
In 1900, the county had a population of 253,182 people and was composed of the following linguistic communities:

Total:

 Hungarian: 172,967 (68.3%)
 German: 77,293 (30.5%)
 Serbian: 1,011 (0.4%)
 Slovak: 735 (0.3%)
 Croatian: 369 (0.2%)
 Romanian: 1 (0.0%)
 Ruthenian: 0 (0.0%)
 Other or unknown: 806 (0.3%)

According to the census of 1900, the county was composed of the following religious communities:

Total:

 Roman Catholic: 172,151 (68.0%)
 Calvinist: 39,141 (15.5%)
 Lutheran: 31,836 (12.6%)
 Jewish: 8,427 (3.3%)
 Eastern Orthodox: 1,108 (0.4%)
 Greek Catholic: 123 (0.0%)
 Unitarian: 19 (0.0%)
 Other or unknown: 377 (0.2%)

1910

In 1910, the county had a population of 267,267 people and was composed of the following linguistic communities:

Total:

 Hungarian: 189,521 (70.9%)
 German: 74,376 (27.9%)
 Serbian: 1,102 (0.4%)
 Slovak: 789 (0.3%)
 Croatian: 343 (0.1%)
 Romanian: 39 (0.0%)
 Ruthenian: 4 (0.0%)
 Other or unknown: 1,085 (0.4%)

According to the census of 1910, the county was composed of the following religious communities:

Total:

 Roman Catholic: 185,863 (69.5%)
 Calvinist: 39,500 (14.8%)
 Lutheran: 31,976 (12.0%)
 Jewish: 8,159 (3.1%)
 Eastern Orthodox: 1,167 (0.4%)
 Greek Catholic: 209 (0.1%)
 Unitarian: 20 (0.0%)
 Other or unknown: 355 (0.1%)

Subdivisions
In the early 20th century, the subdivisions of Tolna county were:

See also

Székelys of Bukovina

References

States and territories disestablished in 1946
Counties in the Kingdom of Hungary